Deathrace King is the fourth album by Swedish death/thrash metal band The Crown.

Reception
Herbert Chwalek of the Power Metal.de said that "The disc is just damn horny from beginning to end and effortlessly blows away most of the oh-so-tough bands."

Artist comments
In a March 2007 interview, The Crown frontman Johan Lindstrand revealed that Deathrace King was his favourite album amongst The Crown's discography. "The whole album has very intense, good songs", remarked Lindstrand. "There are no ups and downs on that album, but all pure ten pointers every song." Tomas Lindberg appears on Devil Gate Ride  and Mika Luttinen from Impaled Nazarene appears on Total Satan.

Track listing

References

The Crown (band) albums
2000 albums
Metal Blade Records albums
Albums produced by Fredrik Nordström